Robert McCormick Jr. (June 8, 1780 – July 4, 1846) was an American inventor who invented numerous devices including a version of the reaper which his eldest son Cyrus McCormick patented in 1834. Although he lived his life in rural Virginia, he was patriarch of the McCormick family that became influential throughout the world, especially in large cities such as Chicago, Washington, D.C. and New York City.

Early life
McCormick was born June 8, 1780, on the family estate of Walnut Grove in Rockbridge County, Virginia, in the Shenandoah Valley on the western side of the Blue Ridge Mountains. His parents were Revolutionary War veteran Robert McCormick Sr. and Martha (née Sanderson) McCormick. Robert Jr. had five elder siblings: George, Martha, Elizabeth, William, and James.

McCormick's maternal grandparents were Scottish immigrants, George Sanderson and Catharine (née Ross) Sanderson. His paternal grandparents were Thomas (1702–1762) and Elizabeth (née Carruth) McCormick, Presbyterian immigrants born in County Londonderry and County Antrim, Ireland respectively who married in 1728 and settled in Cumberland County, Pennsylvania in 1735.

Career
McCormick and his wife Polly raised their eight children on the farm who grew up helping in the shop and the mill. He frequently busied himself with small gadgets and inventions around the farm.  By 1809, McCormick had constructed a partially completed reaper. He eventually decided to formalize some of his work when he applied for a patent in 1830 for a "hemp-break", a device for breaking hemp and flax.  He also produced a threshing machine, a clover sheller of stone, a blacksmith's bellows and a hill-side plow.

By 1831, he had completed a reaper. He was encouraged by Polly to give it to their assertive and business-minded son Cyrus, who was able to improve and patent it in 1834 and establish the McCormick Harvesting Machine Company which led to the great wealth the family accumulated.

Personal life
On February 11, 1808, McCormick was married to Mary Ann McChesney "Polly" Hall (1780–1853), a daughter of Patrick Hall and Susan (née  McChesney) Hall, and was granted ownership of Walnut Grove, the family estate, in 1810. Together, Robert and Polly were the parents of eight children:

 Cyrus Hall McCormick (1809–1884), who moved to Chicago and married Nettie Fowler in 1858.
 Robert Hall McCormick (1810–1826).
 Susan Jane McCormick (1813–1826).
 William Sanderson McCormick (1815–1865), who joined Cyrus in Chicago and married Mary Ann Grigsby in 1848.
 Mary Caroline McCormick (1817–1888), who married Rev. James Shields IV in 1847.
 Leander James McCormick (1819–1900), who also joined Cyrus in Chicago and married Henrietta Maria Hamilton in 1845.
 John Prestly McCormick (1820–1849).
 Amanda Joanna McCormick (1822–1891), who married Hugh Adams in 1845.

He died on July 4, 1846.  He and his wife were buried in the cemetery of the Old Providence Stone Church just north of the estate.

Legacy
In 2002, Robert Jr. and his three surviving sons had a variety of wheat named after them, for "inventing, perfecting, manufacturing, and marketing of the mechanical grain reaper [which] ushered in the era of modern agriculture and wrought one of the greatest advancements in agricultural history." McCormick is a soft red winter wheat (Triticum aestivum L.) developed and released in May 2002 by the Virginia Agricultural Experiment Station.

Family tree

References

Bundled references

External links

 

1780 births
1846 deaths
19th-century American inventors
American people of Scotch-Irish descent
American people of Scottish descent
McCormick family
People from Rockbridge County, Virginia